The 2019 Colorado Springs Elections will be held in 2 segments in 2019. The  Tuesday, April 2, 2019 election includes Mayor of Colorado Springs, 3 Colorado Springs City Council at-large positions and 1 Colorado Springs Ballot Issue. The election on Tuesday, November 5, 2019, will include 4 Colorado Springs School District 11 Board of Education seats.

Mayor

Republican incumbent mayor John Suthers is running for re-election to Mayor of Colorado Springs.

All Candidates are confirmed on the Colorado Springs City Clerk website.

RESULT: John Suthers was re-elected Mayor of Colorado Springs.

Declared
 Lawrence Martinez - IexistthereforeIcount.com
 John Pitchford - No Website
 John Suthers - Incumbent - SuthersforMayor.com
 Juliette Parker - ParkerforCOS.com

Results

City Council

Unaffiliated incumbent city council member Merv Bennett is term-limited and cannot run for another term on the city council. Unaffiliated incumbent city council members Bill Murray and Tom Strand will be running for re-election.

All Candidates are confirmed on the Colorado Springs City Clerk website.

RESULT: Wayne Williams and Incumbents Bill Murray and Tom Strand were elected to the Colorado Springs City Council.

Declared
 Gordon Klingenschmitt - Former State Representative from 2014 - 2016 - GordonforColorado.com
 Bill Murray - Incumbent - No Website
 Val Snider - Former City Council At-Large Member from 2011 - 2015 - ValSnider.com
 Wayne Williams - Former Colorado Secretary of State from 2015 - 2019 - WinWithWayne.org
 Tony Gioia - Tony4COS.com
 Terry Martinez - Primary Candidate against Marc Snyder for House District 18 - Martinez4cos.org
 Regina English - reginaenglish.com
 Tom Strand - Incumbent - StandwithStrandCOS.com
 Randy Tuck - www.electrandytuck.com
 Athena Roe - www.athena4colorado.com
 Dennis Spiker - DennisSpiker4CS.com

Results

Withdrew from Race
 John Pitchford - Running for Mayor

Issues on Ballot

The following Issues will be on the April election ballot.

Issue 1 - Collective Bargaining for all Uniformed Fire Department Employees

RESULTS: Issue 1 was struck down.

Results

Colorado Springs School District 11 Board of Education

Unaffiliated incumbent school board members Nora Brown and Elaine Naleski are term-limited and cannot run for another election. Unaffiliated incumbent school board members Theresa Null and Mary Coleman are eligible to run for re-election should they choose to do so. Mary Coleman is running for re-election, Theresa Null is not running for re-election.

Ballot List
School Board Candidates were pulled on 9/3/2019 and will appear on the El Paso County Ballot on November 5, 2019 in the following order.

 Mary Coleman - Incumbent - https://marycoleman719.wixsite.com/website
 Darleen Daniels - D11 Community Member - http://www.electdarleendaniels.com
 Joseph Shelton - Alumni of Colorado Springs School District 11 - http://sheltonford11.com 
 Conner Sargent - Former D11 Student - http://ConnerSargent.com
 Jason Jorgenson - D11 Community Member - http://electjasonjorgenson.org
 Parth Melpakam - Former Chair of D11 Accountability Committee - http://www.electparth.com
 Vincent Puzick - D11 Community Member - http://puzick4d11.wixsite.com/puzick4d11boe
 Chris Wallis - http://www.chrisford11.com

Results
Results shown per the El Paso County Clerk and Recorder office.

RESULT:Mary Coleman, Darleen Daniels, Parth Melpakam and Jason Jorgeonson were elected to the School Board of District 11.

References

2019 Colorado elections
November 2019 events in the United States
April 2019 events in the United States
Colorado Springs, Colorado